Gianluca Ferrero (born 1963) is an Italian businessman and is the president of Juventus Football Club as of 18 January 2023.

Biography 
Born in Turin in 1963, Ferrero graduated in Business Economics in 1988 at the University of Turin with the highest mark. In 1989, he registred to the Order of Chartered accountants and in 1995 he registred to the Order of Statutory auditors. In November 2022, Exor, which is the largest shareholder of Juventus F.C., appointed Ferrero as Chairman of the bianconeri from 18 January 2023.

References 

Living people
1963 births
Businesspeople from Turin
University of Turin alumni
Juventus F.C. chairmen and investors